Adithan is a surname. Notable people with the surname include:

R. Puthunainar Adithan, Indian politician
S. Kesava Adithan (1933–1982), Indian politician
Sivanthi Adithan (1936–2013), Indian businessman and philanthropist

Indian surnames